Megaleledone setebos, the giant Antarctic octopus, is a very large octopus with a circum-Antarctic distribution. It grows to at least 28 cm in mantle length and 90 cm in total length. M. setebos feeds by drilling small holes in large, shelled mollusks, and then injecting its toxic saliva. The venom even works at subfreezing temperatures.

This species was transferred to the genus Megaleledone and synonymised with Megaleledone senoi in a 2003 paper.

References

Octopuses
Cephalopod genera
Monotypic mollusc genera
Fauna of the Southern Ocean